Neredmet is formally known as Neredu Mettu is a residential neighbourhood in Hyderabad, Telangana, India. It falls under Malkajgiri mandal & Circle in Medchal-Malkajgiri district. Neredmet currently serves as the headquarters of Rachakonda Police commissionerate, one of the three police commissionerates of Hyderabad City. It was earlier a part of Malkajgiri Municipality, but now it is administered under Malkajgiri Circle of GHMC-Secunderabad Zone. It forms Ward No. 136- Neredmet (Fully), Ward No. 137- Vinayak Nagar(Fully), Ward No. 138- Moula-Ali(Half), 
Ward No. 139- East Anandbagh(Partially),
Ward No. 140- Malkajgiri (Half), of Greater Hyderabad Municipal Corporation.

History of Neredmet
It was founded in 1578 AD, But population increased from development of RK Puram lake also known as (Munkidigan Cheruvu).
Old Neredmet Village has its own Fort, walls, Watch tower ruins at Neredmet Gadi (Fort).

By the early 1800s, the Electronics and Mechanical Engineering (EME), which is presently the Military College of Electronics and Mechanical Engineering (MCEME), had been set up at Trimulgherry. The engineers and electricians who worked here needed water, So RK Puram Lake was commissioned by the Nizam and dug up in the mid-1800s, occupying a space of around 100 acres.

Speaking to TNM, Murali Chemuturi, a writer and long-time resident of the area, narrates, “Mudfort, which is now just the name of an area, was the first place where the East India Company built its garrison. Over time, the garrison expanded, and soon it had spread all the way up to Bolaram.”

By the early 1800s, the Electronics and Mechanical Engineering (EME), which is presently the Military College of Electronics and Mechanical Engineering (MCEME), had been set up.

Though it is now a populated area in the city, this was the time that people first settled in then Neredmet village.

“The engineers and electricians who worked there needed two main services. First, they had dry toilets and needed someone for manual scavenging, and secondly, they needed milk and food. For the first, they hired some Scheduled Caste people from Tamil Nadu and for the second purpose, they hired Yadavs (a cattle-breeding caste), from Uttar Pradesh,” Murali says.

“The two groups were housed nearby, and while Neredmet became the village
RK Puram was the hamlet where the SC persons stayed,” he adds.

All three of these groups needed water, so the RK Puram Lake was commissioned by the Nizam and dug up in the mid-1800s, occupying a space of around 100 acres.

After the sepoy mutiny in 1857, the British continued to expand aggressively, and the area's population began to grow.

The lake remained a major source of drinking water and largely clean, until the late 1960s, when the Electronics Corporation of India Limited (ECIL) was established.

“There was no shortage of water, which is why the old houses in RK Puram have no well or borewell. In 1965, Sainik Nagar was the first colony to be allotted. Despite this, the lake remained clean, as the colony remained downstream of the lake,” says Murali.

“After ECIL came up, the politicians of the time laid a road right through the lake, to create a shortcut. In 1976, the lake flooded the road, following which it was raised by 5 feet by the gram panchayat with the help of mud and stones,” he adds.

According to locals, this was when a large portion of the lake was killed, as the water that was cut off from the rest of the lake, was eventually dumped with debris and flattened.

“However, it was only in the mid-80s that things started going downhill, as several colonies like GK Colony, Sri Colony, Bank Colony and Bhagat Singh Nagar were built upstream, and untreated sewage started flowing directly into the lake,” Murali says.

Sub Regions of Neredmet
Neredmet village is earlier Consists of Ramakrishnapuram and Safilgudem Hamlet villages. Now they totally merged in it.

 Ramakrishnapuram 
 New Neredmet
 Kakatiya Nagar 
 Old Neredmet  
 Vinayak Nagar
 Old Safilguda
 New Safilguda

Postal areas of Neredmet are - Ramakrishnapuram(P.O) & Neredmet(B.O)-500056,  Sainikpuri(P.O)-500094, Gokul Nagar(B.O)-500062

Ramakrishnapuram
The Old Hamlet of Neredmet Village is known as RK Puram (Ramakrishnapuram). Colonies in RK Puram include
RK Puram Village
Sapthagiri Colony
Bharani Colony
Chandra Babu Naidu Colony
Raghavendra Nagar
Matrupuri Colony
GK Colony
Brundavan Colony
Prem Nagar
Ananthaiah Colony
Santhosh Colony
Balaji Colony
Sri Venkateshwara Officers Colony
Asha Officers Colony
Shakthi Nagar
Gandhi Nagar
Sree Colony
Bank Colony
Anantha Saraswathi Colony
Brindhavan Colony

New Neredmet 
New Neredmet X Road surrounding areas are called as Neredmet X Road or New Neredmet.
 Madhura Nagar
 Defence Colony Layout 
 Vayupuri Colony Layout 
 Sri colony
 J.J.Nagar
 Vivekanandapuram Colony 
 Sainik Vihar Colony

Kakatiya Nagar
West Kakatiya Nagar
East Kakatiya Nagar 
Deendayal Nagar
 Sri Sai Nagar 
Radhakrishna Housing (RKH) Colony
Samathanagar 
Vinobhanagar 
Hill Colony
Shiva Sai Nagar
J.K Colony (Ancient Devathala Bavi Area)
 Ambedkar Nagar
 Gokul Nagar
 Parvati Nagar

Old Neredmet Village

 Old Neredmet Village (Including Neredmet Gaddi(Fort), Hydergudem Basti, Neredmet Bodrai, Yadav Basti, Harjan Basti, Kindi Basti, Mallana Temple Area,Chipirinllu Basthi)
Keshawa Nagar (Old Police Station)
Bhagath singh Nagar
Panduloan Board Hills (Soudalamma Ancient Temple Area 700 years Old Temple)
New Vidya Nagar
Devi Nagar Colony
Ram Brahma Nagar Colony
Sainik Nagar Avenue Colony
Seetaram Nagar Colony
Sri krishna Nagar Colony
Adarsh Nagar Colony
Shirdi Sai Colony
Adithya Nagar Colony
LB Nagar
Krupa Complex
Balram Nagar Colony

Vinayak Nagar
Vinayak Nagar was earlier called as Gubadi Gutta or Gubadi hill. Before 1970's was forest area in Neredmet Village. In 1980's the total area was encorched by local people converted it as a Basti or Slum, Named as Vinayak Nagar.
Locaties of Vinayak Nagar. They are following Below.
 Vinayak Nagar Basthi
 Tarkrama Nagar Basthi
 East Dinakar Nagar Colony
 West Dinakar Nagar Colony

Old Safilguda
The Old Hamlet of Neredmet Village is known as Safilgudem now known as Old Safilguda.
 Sudha Nagar Colony
 Pragathi Nagar Colony
 Lakshmi Nagar
 NBHS Colony
 Simhadri Nagar Colony
 Dawarakamai Colony
 PB Colony
 Santhoshimaa Nagar Colony
 Bharat Nagar (Adjecent Moula Ali Hill)
 Venkateshwara Nagar Colony
 Sainathpuram 
 Geetha Nagar
 Ganesh Nagar
 Jawahar Nagar
 Akula  Narayana Colony

Safilguda (New) / Station Safilguda 
The Old Hamlet of Neredmet Village is known as Safilguda or Station Safilguda (Before 1980's).
This area is in between Safilguda X road - Safilguda Railway station - RK Nagar - Uttam Nagar region is Known as Safilguda (New). Safilguda is well connected with Roadsand Railways. Colonies in New Safilguda include:

 Chandragiri Colony
 Surya Nagar Enclave
 Sharada Nagar
 Chanakyapuri Colony
 Radha Krishna Nagar
 Uttam Nagar
 Dayanand Nagar

Services, schools and religious places

Hospitals
 Esha Hospital, Sapthagiri Colony, Neredmet X Road
 Sriya Hospital, Kakatiya Nagar, Neredmet Old Police Station.
 Nagarjuna Hospital, Sapthagiri Colony, Neredmet X Road.
 Sudha Hospital, Chandragiri Colony, Neredmet.
 Sun Flower Hospital, Neredmet X Roads.

Metropolitan Court
 X Metropolitan Magistrate Court - Malkajgiri. Located in Neredmet Vayupuri and Vajpayee Nagar as well.

Schools 
 DAV Safilguda
 Army Public School RK Pruam.
 St.Mother Teresa High School, R.K.Puram
 Indian High School GK colony, Neredmet
 Bhavans College Neredmet, Neredmet X Roads
 Govt Jr and Degree College Malkajgiri at Neredmet Vajpayee Nagar
 Govt "District Institute of Education For Teacher Training Institute" Of Hyderabad/ DIET Hyderabad College, Old Neredmet 
 Bhasyam High School Old Neredmet
 Govt Zila Parishat High School Old Neredmet
 Nagendra Public School
 St Marks Grammar High School
 Nalanda High School Chandragiri Colony Neredmet
 Little Pearls High School, Neredmet
 Kairali Vidya Bhavan School, Kakatiya Nagar, Neredmet Old PS 
 Helen Keller's Institute for Research and Rehabilitation for the disabled children

Religious places 
 Sri Baala Aanjaneya Swamy Devalayam Old Neredmet Village.
 Gadi(Fort) Maisaamma Temple at Neredmet Fort Ruins.
 Sri Muthyalamma - Chittharamma - Durgaamma Devalayam  Old Neredmet Village
 Grama Bodrai Old Neredmet Village
 Sri Komuravelli Mallana Swamy Temple - Beside Andhra Bank, Old Neredmet Village.
 Soudaamma Anicent Temple (800 years Old) Hill top, Near Panduloan Board, Neredmet. 
 Nallapochamma, Mahankali, Muthyalamma Neredmet Moodu Gullu Old Neredmet Village.
 Sri Kasi Vishwanath Swamy Temple, 3 Temples Road, Old Neredmet Village.
 Sri Varasidhi Vinayaka Swamy Devalayam - Chandragiri Colony, Safilguda.
 Safilguda Sri Vijayadurga Katta Maisamma Yellamma Temple Safilguda Lake Park Road.
 Sri Shabarimala Ayyappa Swamy Temple, Chanakyapuri, Safilguda.
 Santoshimaa Temple Old Safilguda, Vinayak Nagar, Neredmet, Safilguda.
 Sri Vinayaka Temple Chandragiri Colony Neredmet, Safilguda.
 Jamia Masjid-E-Noor Mosque 
 Hyderabad Kalibari Vivekanandapuram, Neredmet
 Bethel Marthoma Church - Old Neredmet
 El-Shaddai Prayer House

Transport
Neredmet is well connected by TSRTC city bus services with Secunderabad, Tirumalagiri and ECIL X Roads.

Neredmet is connected by suburban rail, railway stations include:

 Ammuguda Railway Station
 Ramakistapuram Gate Railway Station
 Safilguda Railway Station
 Neredmet Railway Station (Under Construction) - MMTS Phase 2.

Nearest Hyderabad Metro station is Mettuguda metro station

Lakes and water parks
 Ramakrishnapuram Lake was made in 1798.
 Safilguda Mini Tankband
 Banda Chervu At Old Safilguda, Neredmet.

References

Neighbourhoods in Hyderabad, India
Cities and towns in Medchal–Malkajgiri district
Municipal wards of Hyderabad, India